Prathivadhi Bhayankaram Aṇṇan was a Sri Vaishnava acharya, Tamil and Sanskrit scholar, and the composer of the popular Venkateswara Suprabhatam. 

Born Hasthigirinathar Aṇṇan in the year 1361, he was one of the prominent disciples of Kumara Nayanacharyas, belonged to a distinguished line of "Acharya Puruṣas", amassing followers. Aṇṇan composed many hymns, of which the popular Venkateshwara Suprabhatham, Venkateṣa Stotram, Venkateṣa Prapatti and Venkateṣa Mangaļāṣāsanam are recited daily at the Tirumala Venkateswara Temple at the wee-hours of the day to ritually rouse Venkateshvara. The rendition of the hymns by the singer M S Subbulakshmi is played everyday in millions of households in India and abroad.

Life 
Aṇṇan was born in Kanchipuram, and initiated into the Sri Vaishnava Sampradāyam by his father, who was the 10th generation descendant of Mudumbai Nambi, one of the 74 simhāsanādipathis appointed by Ramanuja. He later became a disciple of Vedanta Desika's son, Nayana-Varadāchārya. Nayana-Varadāchārya gave him the name "Prathivathi Bhayankaram Aṇṇan". Aṇṇan was acknowledged as an authority on Sanskrit literature and spiritual discourses in his time. He is said to be the most prominent scholar in South India of his time, and was widely respected throughout India. After studying Sribhaṣyam from Nayana-Varadāchārya, Aṇṇan went to the Tirumala Venkateswara Temple, and rendered devotional service to Venkateswara.

At the Tirumala Venkateswara Temple, Aṇṇan heard the glories of Manavala Mamuni and about his discourses on the works of the Alvars, and the doctrines of the Sri Vaishnava Sampradayam. Following this, Aṇṇan became the disciple of Manavala Mamuni, and learnt the entire commentaries of these works from him at Srirangam. Manavala Mamuni gave him the dāsya nama "Sri Vaiṣnava Dāsan", seeing his humility towards the devotees of their deity. Further, Manavala Mamuni, after seeing Annan's prowess in Sribhāṣyam, bestowed him the Sribhāṣya Simhāsanam, and the title 'Sribhāṣyāchārya'. Aṇṇan also served as one of the ashtadiggajas of Manavala Mamuni.

Literary works

Sri Venkateṣa Suprabhātam, 
Sri Venkateṣa Stotram,
Sri Venkateṣa Prapatti, 
Sri Venkateṣa Mangaļa Sāsanam, authored as ordered by Māmunigaļ.
Short Commentary (Vyākhya) for Sri Bhaṣyam, 
Short Commentary (Vyākhya) for Srimad Bhāgavatam, 
Short Commentary (Vyākhya) for Subala Upaniṣada.
Commentary (Vyākhya) for Bhattar's Aṣta Shloki.
Sapthathi Rathnamālika (A 73-verse ode to Swami Vedanta Deṣikan, praising his calibre in Sampradāya and literature)
Varavara Muni Sathakam (100 ṣlokas in Sanskrit in glorification of Māmunigaļ), 
Varavara Muni Mangalam, 
Varavara Muni Suprabhātam, "Cheyya Thāmarai Thālinai Vāḻiye…"
Vāḻi Thirunamam Of Māmunigal (recited at the end of Arulicheyal Goṣti), 
Other Sloka Granthams
Other Stotra Granthams

References

1361 births
14th-century composers
15th-century composers
Indian Sanskrit scholars
Indian Medieval linguists
15th-century deaths
15th-century Indian musicians
15th-century Indian scholars
People from Kanchipuram district
Musicians from Tamil Nadu
Scholars from Tamil Nadu
Kanchipuram